Longjumeau Station is one of two station in Paris' express suburban rail system, the RER C, in the city of Longjumeau.

See also 
 List of stations of the Paris RER

External links 
 

Réseau Express Régional stations
Railway stations in France opened in 1886